Ascalaphini is the type subfamily of the neuropteran owlfly family. Most species are found in the tropics. Their characteristic apomorphy , shared with the Ululodini, is the ridge which divides each of their large compound eyes; both groups are thus sometimes known as split-eyed owlflies.  The group has been alternatly treated as a subfamily of Ascalaphidae, when the family is treated separate from Myrmelontidae, or as a tribe, when the ascalaphids are treated as a subfamily in an expanded Myrmelontidae.

Like the other owlflies, they are insectivores. Imagines are cumbersome fliers and lack the strong mouthparts of dragonflies (which owlflies resemble at first glance, despite being not at all closely related insects) or other decidedly predatory insects, they are restricted to small and defenseless prey. The larvae on the other hand resemble antlions in appearance and habits and are voracious ambush predators, able to tackle prey like ants that will not be eaten without a struggle.

The ascalaphine split-eyed owlflies form one of the two main lineages of living Ascalaphidae, the other being the Haplogleniini which have unsplit eyes like their ancestors. The first fossil record of the Ascalaphinae dates to the Miocene, and the subfamily thus probably evolved in the latter half or towards the end of the Paleogene.

Genera 
There are 70 described genera in the subfamily Ascalaphinae.

 Abascalaphus Tjeder & Hansson, 1992
 Acheron (insect) Lefèbvre 1842
 Acmonotus McLachlan, 1871
 Agadirius Badano & Pantaleoni, 2012
 Agrionosoma van der Weele, 1909
 Angolania Koçak & Kemal, 2008
 Angustacsa New, 1984
 Ascalaphodes McLachlan, 1871
 Ascalaphus Fabricius, 1775
 Ascalohybris Sziráki, 1998
 Ascapseudoptynx Abrahám & Mészáros, 2006
 Aspoeckiella Hölzel 2004
 Botjederinus Abrahám, 2011
 Brevibarbis Tjeder & Hansson, 1992
 Bubomyiella Tjeder & Hansson, 1992
 Bubopsis McLachlan 1898
 Cirrops Tjeder 1980
 Deleproctophylla Lefèbvrem 1842
 Dentalacsa New, 1984
 Dicolpus Gerstaecker, 1885
 Disparomitus van der Weele, 1909
 Dixonotus Kimmins, 1950
 Dorsomitus Michel & Tjeder, 2018
 Encyoposis McLachlan 1871
 Encyopsidius Navás 1912
 Eremoides Tjeder 1992
 Farakosius Michel 1998
 Fillus Navás 1919
 Forcepacsa New 1984
 Glyptobasis McLachlan 1871
 Helcopteryx McLachlan 1871
 Horischema Mészáros & Abrahám, 2003
 Kimulodes Tjeder & Hansson 1992
 Libelloides Schäffer 1763
 Lobalacsa New 1984
 Mabiza Tjeder & Hansson 1992
 Maezous Ábrahám 2008
 Mansellacsa Hölzel 2004
 Megacmonotus New 1984
 Nagacta Navás 1914
 Nanomitus Navás 1912
 Nephelasca Navás 1914
 Nephoneura McLachlan 1871
 Nousera Navás 1923
 Ogcogaster Westwood 1847
 Parascalaphus Martynova 1926
 Parasuphalomitus New 1984
 Perissoschema Mészáros & Abrahám 2003
 Phalascusa Kolbe 1897
 Pictacsa New 1984
 Pilacmonotus New 1984
 Proctarrelabis Lefèbvre 1842
 Protacheron Weele 1909
 Protidricerus Weele 1909
 Protobubopsis van der Weele 1909
 Pseudencyoposis van der Weele, 1909
 Pseudodisparomitus New 1984
 Pseudohybris van der Weele 1909
 Pseudoproctarrelabris van der Weele 1909
 Puer (insect) Lefèbvre 1842
 Siphlocerus McLachlan 1871
 Stephanolasca van der Weele 1909
 Strixomyia Tjeder 1989
 Stylascalaphus Sziráki 1998
 Suhpalacsa Lefèbvre, 1842
 Suphalomitus  van der Weele 1909
 Tytomyia Tjeder & Hansson 1992
 Ululomyia Tjeder 1992
 Umbracsa New 1984
 Venacsa New 1984

References

External links

Myrmeleontidae
Insect tribes